Pistolita was an indie rock band from San Diego, California.  They previously toured as an opening act for bands such as Brand New and Saves the Day, and were featured on the Volcom Stage at Warped Tour 2006.

Pistolita was a nominee for Best Alternative Album at San Diego Music Awards. The ceremony was held on September 18, 2006.

History 
Conor Meads and Cory Stier were childhood friends and next door neighbors. Although Meads was three years older, the two were inseparable. Justin Shannon (guitar) and Alex Kuhse (bass) knew Meads and Stier from high school, and in the wake of their graduation, the four friends decided to put their musical talents together and start Pistolita. The band was primarily influenced by Fugazi, At the Drive-In, Hot Water Music and Hot Snakes. 

Conor Meads followed up "Oliver Under The Moon" with 2009 "The Paper Boy (EP)".

Pistolita was the first signing on Montalban Hotel Records, a label run by booking agent Andrew Ellis, as a subsidiary of East West Records and Warner Music Group.

Their song "Beni Accident" was featured on EA Sports' video game NHL 07.

Discography 
 Gliss Note (EP) (2005)
 Oliver Under the Moon (LP) 2006, Montalban Hotel
 The Paper Boy (EP) (2009)

Collaborations 
 Pick Your Battles, Volume 1 along with Denver Harbor, Underoath, Noise Ratchet, The Juliana Theory and Anberlin.

Notes

External links 
 Pistolita official Myspace
 Pistolita official Purevolume
 Vans Warped Tour

Indie rock musical groups from California
Musical groups from San Diego